Aziza or Azizah may refer to:


Given name

Aziza
 Aziza Abdel-Halim, chairwoman of the Muslim Women's National Network Australia
 Aziza Brahim (born 1976), Sahrawi singer
 Aziza Jafarzadeh (1921–2003), Azerbaijani writer
 Aziza Mustafa Zadeh (born 1969), Azerbaijani musician
 Azize Tanrıkulu (born 1986), Turkish martial artist
 Aziza Abdelfattah (born 1990), Egyptian synchronized swimmer
 Aziza Sleyum Ally, Member of Parliament in the National Assembly of Tanzania
 Aziza Ali, Singaporean former chef, food consultant, businessperson, artist, jeweller, and author
 Aziza Hussein, Paralympian athlete from Egypt
 Aziza Sbaity (born 1991), Lebanese sprinter

Azizah
 Azizah Y. al-Hibri, American philosopher and academic
 Azizah Mohd Dun (born 1960), Sabah's State Minister for Community Development and Consumer Affairs
 Azizah Abd Allah Abu Lahum (born 1945), Yemeni novelist and writer
 Tunku Azizah Aminah Maimunah (born 1960), current Queen Consort of Malaysia
 Wan Azizah Wan Ismail (born 1952), Malaysian politician

Other 
 Aziza (African mythology), African legendary creature
 Aziza (Quest for Glory), a character in the Quest for Glory video game series
 "L'Aziza", a 1985 Daniel Balavoine song
 Aziza (album), a 2016 album by bassist Dave Holland
 Aziza (1980 film), a Tunisian and Algerian drama film
 Aziza (2019 film), a short film directed by Soudade Kaadan
 Azizah, an American magazine

See also 
Aziz (equivalent masculine name)
Ariza (disambiguation)